"Just Ace" is the fourth single released by Australian rock band Grinspoon, from their debut album, Guide to Better Living.  It peaked at No. 25 on the ARIA Singles Chart, remaining in the charts for fifteen weeks. It also reached No. 18 on Triple J's Hottest 100 in 1998.

"Just Ace" was written by band members Phil Jamieson and Pat Davern. "Just Ace" was recorded at Rocking Horse Studios in February 1997.  The B-sides were recorded at Grudgefest in Sydney on Saturday 27 September 1997.

Track listing

Charts

Personnel
Grinspoon members
 Phil Jamieson – vocals, guitar
 Pat Davern – guitar
 Joe Hansen – bass guitar 
 Kristian Hopes – drums

Production details
 Recording Engineer – Greg Courtney (track 1), Rob Taylor (tracks 2–7)
 Mastering – Don Bartley
 Mixing – Phillip McKellar (track 1), Rob Taylor (tracks 2–7)
 Producer – Phil McKellar, Grinspoon – Producer
 Studio – Rocking Horse Studios

References

1998 singles
Grinspoon songs
Song recordings produced by Phil McKellar
1997 songs
Universal Records singles
Songs written by Phil Jamieson
Songs written by Pat Davern